Youtopia is a 2018 Italian drama film directed by Berardo Carboni.

Synopsis
Youtopia is the story of a young woman who decides to sell her virginity to pay the debts of her mother and of the man who decides to buy it. It's a Bildungsroman in which the protagonist discovers new worlds and new feelings.

Cast

References

External links

2018 films
2010s Italian-language films
2018 drama films
Italian drama films
Films about the Internet
Films about social media
Films about dysfunctional families
Films about prostitution in Italy
2010s Italian films